Bessette is a French Canadian surname. Notable people with the surname include:

 André Bessette, Holy Cross Brother and a significant French-Canadian religious figure
 Carolyn Bessette-Kennedy, wife of John F. Kennedy Jr.
 Gérard Bessette, French Canadian author and educator
 Lauren Bessette, American investment banker and the sister-in-law of John F. Kennedy Jr.
 Lyne Bessette, professional bicycle racer from Quebec, Canada
 Matt Bessette, American mixed martial artist

French-language surnames